"There are no atheists in foxholes" is an aphorism used to suggest that times of extreme stress or fear can prompt belief in a higher power. In the context of actual warfare, such a sudden change in belief has been called a foxhole conversion. The logic of the argument is also used to argue for the opposite.

Origin
The statement is an aphorism used to argue that people will believe in, or hope for, a higher power in times of fear or stress, such as during war ("in foxholes"). The origin of the quotation is uncertain. The U.S. military chaplain William Thomas Cummings may have said it in a field sermon during the Battle of Bataan in 1942, though scholars have been unable to find a firsthand witness to the sermon. Other sources credit Lieutenant Colonel Warren J. Clear (or the anonymous sergeant he spoke with there), who was also at Bataan and published the usage in 1942; or Lieutenant Colonel William Casey. The phrase is often attributed to war correspondent Ernie Pyle; however, no such source published prior to Pyle's death is known. It was also quoted by President Dwight D. Eisenhower in remarks broadcast from the White House as part of a February 7, 1954, American Legion Program. With slightly different wording, the statement appears much earlier in press reports dating from the end of the First World War, while a similar concept has been sought in Plato's Laws, and in Karl Marx's often-misrepresented partial quote that "Religion is the sigh of the oppressed creature, the heart of a heartless world, and the soul of soulless conditions. It is the opium of the people".

Usage
While primarily used to comment on the experiences of combat soldiers, the aphorism has been adapted to other perilous situations, as in "There are no atheists in probate court". Although the adage occasionally means that all soldiers in combat are "converted" under fire, it is most often used to express the belief of the speaker that all people seek a divine power when they are facing an extreme threat. The quote is also referenced when discussing the opposite effect — that warfare causes some soldiers to question their existing belief in God due to the death and violence around them.

The quote has also been used in non-military contexts. In September 2008, in the depths of the financial crisis of 2007–2010, both Ben Bernanke and Paul Krugman popularized a version of the quote in reference to financial crises. They paraphrased Harvard professor Jeffrey Frankel, who originally wrote in the Cato Journal a year earlier, "They say 'there are no atheists in foxholes.' Perhaps, then, there are also no libertarians in crises." The sentence is also quoted in the Gustav Hasford's novel The Short-Timers.

Criticism
Several atheist organizations object to the phrase. The Military Association of Atheists & Freethinkers has adopted the catch-phrase "Atheists in Foxholes" to emphasize that the original statement is just an aphorism and not a fact. The religious convictions of current US military personnel are similar to those of the general American population, though studies suggest that members of the military are slightly less religious. Department of Defense (DoD) demographics show that "Atheist" is selected as a religious preference (0.55% or less than 1 percent of the total DoD force) more than non-Christian options such as Agnostic (0.12%), Hindu (0.07%), Buddhist (0.38%), Muslim (0.24%), and Jewish (0.33%). Author James Morrow said: "That maxim, 'There are no atheists in foxholes,' it's not an argument against atheism — it's an argument against foxholes." In 2015, describing the phrase as a "tired, old, untrue cliché", the Freedom From Religion Foundation erected a monument to "Atheists in Foxholes", commemorating American atheist, agnostic, freethinking and skeptical US armed services veterans.

Joe Simpson, author of Touching the Void, addresses the issue in the film adaptation of his nearly fatal climb up the Siula Grande mountain. Referring to the moment when he lay at the bottom of a deep crevasse, dehydrated, alone, and with a broken leg, he states:
"I was totally convinced I was on my own, that no one was coming to get me. I was brought up as a devout Catholic. I'd long since stopped believing in God. I always wondered if things really hit the fan, whether I would, under pressure, turn round and say a few Hail Marys and say 'Get me out of here'. It never once occurred to me. It meant that I really don't believe and I really do think that when you die, you die, that's it, there's no afterlife."

Notes

References

External links
 Military Association of Atheists & Freethinkers website
 United Kingdom Armed Forces Humanist Association
 Military Religious Freedom Foundation website

Atheism
Adages
Criticism of atheism
Religion in the military